The Cool Kids of Death is a Polish alternative rock band formed in Łódź in 2001. Their name comes from a Saint Etienne song.

The band is well known in Poland due to their radical lyrics and widely expressing the "Generation Nothing" voice –the "movement" which accused the Polish establishment of constraining the professional chances and future of young and well-educated Poles.

Discography

References

External links

Polish alternative rock groups
Musical groups established in 2001
2001 establishments in Poland
Musicians from Łódź